Chichester, formerly New Chichester in reference to the English city, is a region in Delaware County, Pennsylvania. It includes the townships of Upper Chichester and Lower Chichester, and the boroughs of Marcus Hook, and Trainer. Other communities included in the region are Linwood (Lower Chichester Township), Boothwyn (Upper Chichester Township), Ogden (Upper Chichester Township), and Twin Oaks (Upper Chichester Township).

Geography
Boothwyn is located at  (39.835115, -75.444507).

Ogden is located at  (39.82744 -75.452503).

Twin Oaks is located at  (39.839123,-75.422173).

Linwood is located at  (39.825945, -75.422808).

Marcus Hook is located at  (39.818212, -75.415561).

Trainer is located at  (39.828612, -75.403599).

Boothwyn, Reliance, and Ogden fire companies are all located in and serve Upper Chichester Township.

The Lower Chichester Fire Company is located in and serves Linwood, PA.

The Marcus Hook-Trainer Fire Company server both Marcus Hook and Trainer.

The Sun Oil Fire Company is located in The Sun Oil Refinery in Marcus Hook.

Adjacent areas 
Aston, Pennsylvania - north
Chester, Pennsylvania - northeast
Logan Township, New Jersey - east
Claymont, Delaware - south
Talleyville, Delaware - southwest
Garnet Valley, Pennsylvania - west

Educational system
Chichester is the only part of Chichester School District. Children within the area usually attend  Boothwyn Elementary School (Grades K-4),  Marcus Hook Elementary School (Grades K-4),  Hilltop Elementary School (Grades K-4),  Linwood Elementary School (Grades K-4),  Chichester Middle School (Grades 5-8), and the only high school in the district known as Chichester High School (Grades 9-12). Chichester High School has a math department that consists of eleven teachers.  Holy Saviour St. John Fisher School is located within district.

References

External links
http://www.chichesterhistory.org/

Unincorporated communities in Delaware County, Pennsylvania
Unincorporated communities in Pennsylvania

nl:Chichester
vo:Chichester